Český Krumlov District is a district in the South Bohemian Region of the Czech Republic. Its capital is the town of Prachatice.

Administrative division
Český Krumlov District is divided into two administrative districts of municipalities with extended competence: Český Krumlov and Kaplice.

List of municipalities
Towns are marked in bold and market towns in italics:

Benešov nad Černou -
Besednice -
Bohdalovice -
Brloh -
Bujanov -
Černá v Pošumaví -
Český Krumlov -
Chlumec -
Chvalšiny -
Dolní Dvořiště -
Dolní Třebonín -
Frymburk -
Holubov -
Horní Dvořiště -
Horní Planá -
Hořice na Šumavě -
Kájov -
Kaplice -
Křemže -
Lipno nad Vltavou -
Loučovice -
Malonty -
Malšín -
Mirkovice -
Mojné -
Netřebice -
Nová Ves -
Omlenice -
Pohorská Ves -
Polná na Šumavě -
Přední Výtoň -
Přídolí -
Přísečná -
Rožmberk nad Vltavou -
Rožmitál na Šumavě -
Soběnov -
Srnín -
Střítež -
Světlík -
Velešín -
Větřní -
Věžovatá Pláně -
Vyšší Brod -
Zlatá Koruna -
Zubčice -
Zvíkov

Part of the district territory belongs to Boletice Military Training Area.

Geography

Český Krumlov District is the southernmost Czech district, bordering Austria in the south. The relief is very varied and goes from mountainous areas in the south to a relatively flat landscape in the northeast, with high average elevations. The territory extends into four geomorphological mesoregions: Bohemian Forest Foothills (most of the territory), Bohemian Forest (southwest), Gratzen Mountains (southeast) and Gratzen Mountains Foothills (a strip running from northeast to south).

The most important river is the Vltava, which flows from west to southeast and then turns north. The eastern part of the territory is drained by the Malše, a tributary of the Vltava. Although there are not many bodies of water here, the Lipno Reservoir is built on the Vltava, which is the largest body of water in the Czech Republic.

The west of the territory is protected within the Šumava Protected Landscape Area, the easternmost edge of the Šumava National Park also reaches here in a small part. In the north there is the Blanský Les Protected Landscape Area.

Demographics

Most populated municipalities

Economy
The largest employers with its headquarters in Český Krumlov District and at least 500 employers are:

Transport
There are no motorways in the district. The most important road is the I/3 road, which leads from České Budějovice to the border with Austria and is part of the European route E55.

Sights

The historic centre of Český Krumlov was designated a UNESCO World Heritage Site in 1992 because of its well-preserved Gothic, Renaissance and Baroque architecture.

The most important monuments in the district, protected as national cultural monuments, are:

Český Krumlov Castle
Church of Saint Vitus in Český Krumlov
Church of the Assumption of the Virgin Mary in Kájov
Vyšší Brod Monastery
Zlatá Koruna Monastery
Rožmberk Castle
Baroque theatre in Český Krumlov Castle
Homestead No. 3 in Krnín
Zavis' Cross in Vyšší Brod
Schwarzenberg Canal (partly)

The best-preserved settlements and localities, protected as monument reservations and monument zones, are:

Český Krumlov (monument reservation)
Archaeological site in Třísov (monument reservation)
Benešov nad Černou
Český Krumlov-Plešivec
Chvalšiny
Hořice na Šumavě
Kaplice
Rožmberk nad Vltavou
Vyšší Brod
Čertyně
Krnín
Mirkovice
Pernek
Rojšín
Zlatá Koruna

The most visited tourist destinations are the Treetop Walkway in Lipno nad Vltavou, and Český Krumlov Castle.

References

External links

Český Krumlov District profile on the Czech Statistical Office's website

 
Districts of the Czech Republic